Fallen is a crime novel by the American writer Kathleen George set in 1990s Pittsburgh, Pennsylvania.

It tells the story of the murder of a Pittsburgh doctor, Dan Ross, his distraught wife, and how Commander Richard Christie tracks the killer.

Sources
Contemporary Authors Online. The Gale Group, 2006. PEN (Permanent Entry Number):  0000142340.

External links
  Kathleen George website

2004 American novels
American crime novels

Novels set in Pittsburgh
Novels set in the 1990s